Aphnaeus brahami, the western silver spot, is a butterfly in the family Lycaenidae. It is found in Senegal, Burkina Faso, Ghana (the Volta Region), Benin and Nigeria. The habitat consists of the Guinea/Sudan savanna transition zone.

The former species Aphnaeus coronae, found in Sudan, Uganda and Kenya, is now included in A. brahami.

Subspecies
Aphnaeus brahami brahami
Aphnaeus brahami ghanaensis Libert, 2013
Aphnaeus brahami bakeri Libert, 2013
Aphnaeus brahami coronae Talbot, 1935 (the crowned highflier or crown silver spot) — southern Sudan, northern Uganda
Aphnaeus brahami littoralis Carcasson, 1964 — Kenya: coast to the area north of Mombasa

References

External links
Aphnaeus brahami Lathy, 1903 at Markku Savela's Lepidoptera and Some Other Life Forms
Die Gross-Schmetterlinge der Erde 13: Die Afrikanischen Tagfalter. Plate XIII 69 c

Butterflies described in 1903
Aphnaeus
Butterflies of Africa